In October 1937, there was a mass extermination of Belarusian writers, artists and statespeople by the Soviet Union occupying authorities. This event marked the peak of the Great Purge and repressions of Belarusians in the Soviet-controlled area of eastern Belarus.

More than 100 notable persons were executed, most of them on the night of 2930 October 1937. Their innocence was later admitted by the Soviet Union after Joseph Stalin's death.

History
On 7 September 1937 Joseph Stalin signed a list of persons to be judged by a Soviet Military commission.  The list was also signed by Vyacheslav Molotov, Lazar Kaganovich, Klim Voroshilov and Nikolay Yezhov.  There were trials related to persons from the Belarusian SSR  and these were given in a different list dated 15 September 1937 and signed by Stalin, Molotov and the senior state security official Vladimir Tsesarsky.  The list of people from the Belarusian SSR sentenced to be executed included 103 persons, and six more persons who were sentenced to ten or more years in concentration camps.   

The initial list was extended by the NKVD of the Belarusian SSR.  People added to the list by the NKVD of Belarus are marked with an asterisk (*) in the list below.  The executions took place in the Minsk internal NKVD prison (known as the Amerikanka).   Journalist Leanid Marakoŭ alleged that between 3 March 1937 and 22 May 1938, over 100,000 people fell victims of repressions by the Soviet authorities.

List of executed persons 
 Barys Abuchoŭ
 Mikałaj Arabej, head of primary education department of the Communist Party of Byelorussia
 Navum Aronaŭ
 Ihnat Afanaśjeŭ, lecturer and pedagogue
 Anatol Aŭhusсinovič, head of construction department at the Soviet of People's Commissars (government) of Belarus
 Siamion Babkoŭ
 Hieorhi Barzunoŭ
 Vadzim Baškievič, senior official at the People's Commissariate for Education
 Sałamon Bejlin
 Abram Biełacarkoŭski
 Jakaŭ Branštejn, literary critic
 Ivan Burdyka, government official
 Viktar Vajnoŭ, journalist
 Alaksandar Varončanka, people's commissar (minister) for education of Belarus
 Stanisłaŭ Varšaŭski
 Ryhor Vasiljeŭ-Vaščylin
 Anatol Volny, artist
 Moŭša-Nochim Habajeŭ
 Apanas Habrusioŭ
 Płaton Hałavač, writer
 Anton Hejštern
 Josif Heršon, deputy education minister of Belarus
 Jakaŭ Hinzburh
 Abram Hosin
 Kanstancin Hurski
 Nochman Hurevič
 Mikałaj Dzieniskievič, senior Communist Party official
 Mikałaj Dźmitraŭ
 Anani Dziakaŭ, president of the Belarusian State University in 1934-1935
 Abram Drakachrust
 Aleś Dudar, poet
 Chackiel Duniec, critic and writer
 Hirš Jelanson
 Mikałaj Jermakoŭ
 Ivan Žyvucki, teacher
 Navum Zamalin, junior professor at Vitsebsk Veterinarian Institute
 Michaś Zarecki, writer
 Alaksandar Ziankovič
 Alaksandar Ivanoŭ
 Prochar Ispraŭnikaŭ, agriculture journalist from Vitsebsk
 Zachar Kavaloŭ, statesman, Communist Party official
 Vasil Kaval, writer
 Zachar Kavalčuk, Labour Union leader
 Mikałaj Kandrašuk, senior official at the People's Commisariate for Light Industry of Belarus
 Sałamon Kantar
 Michaił Kapitanaki
 Jazep Karanieŭski, statesman, pedagogue
 Ivan Karpienka, veterinarian
 Hierasim Kačanaŭ
 Viktar Klanicki
 Todar Klaštorny, poet
 Josif Kudzielka, head of copyright department at the Union of Writers of Belarus
 Moyshe Kulbak, Yiddish language writer
 Alaksiej Kučynski, statesman, pedagogue, journalist
 Michaił Łabadajeŭ, Communist Party official
 Leanard Łaškievič, senior agriculture official
 Alaksandar Levin, literature critic
 Sałamon Levin, literature critic
 Pinia Lejbin
 Chaim Lajbovič
 Maksim Laŭkoŭ, justice minister of Belarus
 Siamion Lichtenštejn
 Mikita Łukašonak
 Jurka Lavonny, poet
 Sałamon Lampiert, student
 Elizar Maziel, veterinarian, scientist
 Leŭ Majsiejeŭ, Communist Party of Byelorussia official
 Barys Małaŭ, senior official at the People's Commisariate of Trade
 Valery Marakoŭ, poet
 Sciapan Marhiełaŭ, geography scientist
 Michaił Marholin
 Barys Marjanaŭ, Communist Party of Byelorussia official
 Pavał Masleńnikaŭ
 Andrej Mielik-Šachnazaraŭ
 Abram Mirlin
 Mikalai Misnikou
 Dziamyan Mikhaylau, advisor at the government of Belarus
 Mikałaj Michiejeŭ
 Siarhiej Mićkoŭ, factory director, ministry official
 Siarhiej Murzo, poet
 Pavał Muchin, veterinarian
 Jakaŭ Navachrest
 Ivan Nieściarovič
 Ivan Padsiavałaŭ
 Ivan Papłyka
 Michaił Pasmarnik
 Vasil Pietrušenia, transport and utilities adviser at the government of Belarus
 Ziama Pivavaraŭ, poet
 Michaił Pitomcaŭ
 Apałon Pratapopaŭ
 Ryhor Pratasienia, agriculture chemistry scientist
 Izrail Purys
 Alaksandar Puciłoŭski
 Ivan Pucincaŭ
 Kuźma Piatrašyn
 Janka Niomanski, writer, social activist
 Aron-Lejb Razumoŭski
 Michaił Rydzieŭski, university professor
 Alaksandar Samachvałaŭ
 Jakaŭ Sandamirski, university professor
 Oskar Saprycki, government official
 Ivan Sarokaš
 Jakaŭ Spiektar, government official
 Vasil Starynski
 Vasil Stašeŭski, writer
 Hieorhi Strele, sovkhoz director
 Mikałaj Suroŭcaŭ
 Dźmitry Siałoŭ, official at the education ministry
 Pancialej Siardziuk, biologist
 Miron Tanienbaum
 Judal Taŭbin, poet
 Ivan Trocki
 Ela Trumpacki
 Andrej Turłaj, People's Commissar for sovkhozy of Belarus
 Jaŭhien Uśpienski, physicist
 Ryhor Fałkin
 Aba Finkielštajn
 Jaŭsiej Fłombaŭm
 Isak Frydman, government official
 Dźmitry Charłac
 Izi Charyk, poet
 Piatro Chatuloŭ, literature critic
 Alaksandar Čarnuševič, education minister
 Mikałaj Čarniak
 Michaś Čarot, poet
 Kanstancin Čačura
 Makar Šałaj, literature critic
 Judal Šapira
 Pavał Šastakoŭ, journalist
 Aran Judelson, Yiddish language poet
 Jakaŭ Julkin
 Viktar Jarkin, official at the Dniapro-Dzvina river steamboats navigation in Homel

References

Sources 
 Маракоў Л. Ахвяры і карнікі. Мн.: Зміцер Колас, 2007 г. 
 Грахоўскі С. «Так погибали поэты»/Выбраныя творы. Мн.: Кнігазбор, 2007 г.

See also
 Soviet repressions in Belarus
 Case of the Union of Liberation of Belarus
 Executed Renaissance

External links 
 Victims' biographies on the website of the historian Leanid Marakou

Political and cultural purges
Political repression in the Soviet Union
NKVD
1937 in the Soviet Union
1937 in Belarus
Massacres in Belarus
1937 murders in the Soviet Union